Thomas Doret (born 10 December 1996) is a Belgian actor, best known for playing the role of Cyril in The Kid with a Bike, and as Coco in Renoir.

Life and career
Doret was born in Seraing.  His father is a warehouseman while his mother is a printer. He practiced karate and tennis from the age of 6. He studied at the Athénée Royal Air Pur of Seraing.

In 2013 he participated as Président du jury jeune at the Festival international du film policier de Liège and has also received the honor of Ambassadeur d'honneur de la province de Liège

At 13, he played his first starring film role, playing the role of Cyril, in the Dardenne brothers' film The Kid with a Bike, alongside Cécile de France. In 2012, he played the role of Claude Renoir, one of the son of Pierre Renoir, alongside Michel Bouquet, in Gilles Bourdos' Renoir.

He is currently working in a television series of 6 episodes titled Paris, the series tells the story of daily 14 characters, including Doret, in the capital of France.

Filmography

Awards and nominations

References

External links
 
 

1996 births
Living people
People from Seraing
Belgian male child actors
Magritte Award winners